Madelyn Renée is an American opera singer and soprano.

Life

Born in Boston, Massachusetts on 30 December 1955. She attended the Dana Hall School in Wellesley, Massachusetts and Cornell University, and received her bachelor's degree from the Juilliard School in New York, where she studied with Eleanor Steber and Oren Brown. While at Juilliard she began an eight year affair with Italian tenor Luciano Pavarotti.

Renée made her debut with the San Diego Opera in 1980 singing Mimi in La Bohème opposite Pavarotti, a role she later performed with the tenor in numerous theatres. Renée sang frequently with Luciano Pavarotti, including concerts at Madison Square Garden and at the Hollywood Bowl in addition to appearing with the tenor during his 2002/2003 concert tour in the United States. The soprano has sung in major opera houses worldwide, notably the Vienna Staatsoper,  the Opéra Nationale and the Opéra Comique in Paris, the Metropolitan Opera and the New York City Opera, Milan's Teatro alla Scala, the Sydney Opera, the Opéra de Montecarlo, the Deutsche Oper in Berlin, Geneva's Grand Théâtre, the San Francisco Opera, the Budapest Opera, and the Salzburg Festival. In addition to Milan's La Scala, the artist has appeared at more than thirty opera houses in Italy among which those in Rome, Parma, Turin, Venice, Trieste, Bologna, Lucca, Genova, Verona, Bari and Palermo. Ms. Renée has performed under the baton of distinguished conductors such as Sir Georg Solti, Richard Bonynge, James Levine, Lorin Maazel, Luciano Berio, Daniel Barenboim, Alain Lombard, Gianandrea Gavazzeni, Gustav Kuhn, Evelino Pido, and John Mauceri.

The soprano's repertoire includes La Bohème (Mimi and Musetta), Tosca, La Traviata, Otello, Simon Boccanegra, Falstaff (Alice Ford), Aida (Sacerdotessa), Pagliacci, Cavalleria Rusticana (Santuzza), Le Nozze di Figaro (Contessa) Don Giovanni (Zerlina e Donna Elvira) Zaide, Idomeneo, Cosi Fan Tutte (Despina), Nerone (Atte’), Tales of Hoffmann (Giulietta), Carmen (Micaela), A Midsummer Night's Dream (Helena), The Merry Widow (Hanna Glawari and Valencienne), Faust (Siebel), La Belle Helene, La Perichole, Amelia al Ballo, Street Scene (Rose Maurrant) Die Fledermaus (Rosalinde) Elisir d’amore (Adina) Adriana Lecouvreur, The Mikado. She was chosen to sing the leading role in the world premiere opera by Italian composer Marco Tutino, Dylan Dog.

In addition to her operatic repertoire, Renée performs numerous concerts during the year in Italy and abroad with program selections that range from Baroque to Broadway. Ms. Renée has performed concerts with orchestras such as the RAI National Orchestra, the Rossini Opera Festival Orchestra, Milan's Verdi Orchestra and Manchester's Halle Orchestra to name a few. The artist made her screen debut in Francis Ford Coppola's Godfather III movie, singing and acting in the opera sequences from Cavalleria Rusticana. In Italy, Renee has hosted  a weekly television show for Italian audiences on classical music and opera called “Un Tocco di Classica”.   More recently, Renee has hosted satellite broadcasts that transmit live opera performances to movie theatres throughout Europe and conducted masterclasses at the Guildhall and the National Opera Studio in London. Her most recent recording,  "Some Like It Lyric," combines opera and jazz. The artist resides in Milan, Italy.

Luciano Pavarotti

References

American sopranos
Cornell University alumni
Juilliard School alumni
Living people
Singers from Massachusetts
Year of birth missing (living people)
Dana Hall School alumni
21st-century American women